Wovoka (c. 1856 - September 20, 1932), also known as Jack Wilson, was the Paiute religious leader who founded a second episode of the Ghost Dance movement.  Wovoka means "cutter" or "wood cutter" in the Northern Paiute language.

Biography
Wovoka was born in the Smith Valley area southeast of Carson City, Nevada, around 1856. Quoitze Ow was his birth name. Wovoka's father was Numu-tibo'o (sometimes called Tavibo), who for several decades was incorrectly believed to be Wodziwob, a religious leader who had founded the Ghost Dance of 1870. From the age of eight until almost thirty Wovoka often worked for David Wilson, a rancher in the Yerington, Nevada area, and his wife Abigail, who gave him the name Jack Wilson when dealing with Euro-Americans. David Wilson was a devout Christian, and Wovoka learned Christian theology and Bible stories while living with him.

One of his chief sources of authority among Paiutes was his alleged ability to control the weather.  He was said to have caused a block of ice to fall out of the sky on a summer day, to be able to end drought with rain or snow, to light his pipe with the sun, and to form icicles in his hands.

Wovoka claimed to have had a prophetic vision after falling into a coma during the solar eclipse of January 1, 1889. Wovoka's vision entailed the resurrection of the Paiute dead, and the removal of whites and their works from North America. Wovoka taught that in order to bring this vision to pass, the Native Americans must live righteously and perform a traditional round dance, known as the Ghost Dance.

Wovoka's prophetic message referenced a number of Christian theological concepts. In the "Messiah Letters", Wovoka spoke of Jesus Christ's life on Earth and likened the foretold redemption of Native Americans to a biblical Judgement Day. Wovoka made references to the reunion of the living and the dead, and also advocated for non-violence in the Christian spirit of pacifism and fair temperament. In its imagery and symbolism, the Ghost Dance embodied many of these Christian principles. 

Anthropologists, historians, and theologians provide conflicting accounts on when and how Wovoka had his vision. One scholar of religions, Tom Thatcher, cites James Mooney's Smithsonian-sponsored anthropological report to claim that Wovoka received his first vision while chopping wood for David Wilson in 1887. Conversely, historian Paul Bailey utilized Mooney's work along with interviews with Wovoka's contemporaries and interpreters to assert that he received the vision after entering a two-day trance, awaking in tears. Regardless, shortly after receiving the vision and its message, it moved quickly beyond his local Paiute community by word of mouth to Native American tribes further east, notably the Lakota.

The Ghost Dance movement is known for being practiced by the victims of the Wounded Knee Massacre. Before the Ghost Dance reached Native Americans on South Dakota plains reservations, interest in the movement came from U.S. Indian Office, U.S. War Department, and multiple Native American tribal delegations. As the movement spread across the American west, various interpretations of Wovoka's original message were adopted , notably by the Lakota Sioux living on the Pine Ridge reservation. The Lakota interpretation was considered more militant, placing additional emphasis on the foretold elimination of White men. Although the Lakota interpretation promoted hostility toward US federal agents, it did not explicitly advocate for violent action. Historical evidence suggests that the unconventional practice of Christianity on the part of the Lakota tribe was largely responsible for the tensions between Whites and Native Americans leading up to the Battle at Wounded Knee. US authorities challenged the theological views of the Ghost Dance movement, and arguably sought conflict with the Lakota tribe as a means of condemning these practices. Wovoka never left his home in Nevada to become an active participant in the dance's dissemination in the U.S. interior.

Indian Agents, soldiers, and other federal officials tended to have a hostile and sometimes violent attitude toward the movement.

Post-Wounded Knee life and death
Wovoka was disheartened by how events unfolded at the massacre. He still remained a prominent Native American leader until his death.  Sometime between 1894-1896, he was reported to have been a sideshow attraction at a San Francisco Midwinter Fair Carnival. In 1917, an agent for the Nevada Agency named L.A. Dorrington tracked down Wovoka to report on his whereabouts to Washington. Curious to see if the former Native American messiah had any ties to the Native American Church, Dorrington found that Wovoka was instead living a humble life in Mason. He abstained from the practice, worked as an occasional medicine man, and traveled to events on reservations across the United States.

Wovoka died in Yerington on September 20, 1932, and is interred in the Paiute Cemetery in the town of Schurz, Nevada.

In popular culture

Native American band Redbone named their 1973 album Wovoka, and the title song, after the prophet.

In the 1971 film Billy Jack, Billy, played by Tom Laughlin, teaches the Ghost Dance to Indians and students of the Montessori Freedom School. In the moments leading up to this session, Billy's girlfriend Jean (played by Laughlin's wife, Delores Taylor), explains Wovoka and the Ghost Dance to an abused teenage girl hiding from her abusive father at the school. Jean says that once, even Christ appeared to Wovoka.

In 1988 'Ghost Dance' was remastered and reissued on the eponymous 'Death Cult' compact disc. Reaching No. 2 on the UK Independent Chart when originally released in July 1983. Ian Astbury (singer and songwriter with Billy Duffy) spent formative years in Canada in which his part Native American heritage was to become a small but important part of his songwriting. "Wovoka had a vision, His words went far and wide - Save our once great nation, and dance the dance of Pride."..

In the 2007 film Bury My Heart at Wounded Knee, Wovoka is portrayed by Wes Studi.

The Dead Inklings, an American indie rock band, has written a song about Wovoka and the ghost dance entitled "Them Bones".

The band Old Crow Medicine Show mentions "the prophets from Elijah to the old Paiute Wovoka" in the song "I Hear Them All", from their album Big Iron World. Written by David Rawlings, "I Hear Them All" also appears on his album A Friend of a Friend.

See also
 Handsome Lake
 John Slocum
 Smohalla
 Native American temperance activists

Notes

Further reading
Michael Hittman, Wovoka and the Ghost Dance, Bison Books 1998, 
John Norman, Ghost Dance, Daw Books 1970, (a fictional account)

External links
Ghostdance.us Wovoka Information

The Messiah Letter by Wovoka, translated by James Mooney

1850s births
1932 deaths
19th-century apocalypticists
20th-century apocalypticists
Religious figures of the indigenous peoples of North America
Ghost Dance movement
Paiute people